Rouge and Riches is a lost 1920 silent film drama directed by Harry L. Franklin. It starred Mary MacLaren. It was produced and distributed by the Universal Film Manufacturing Company.

Cast
Mary MacLaren - Becky
Alberta Lee - Aunt Lucia
Robert Walker - Jefferson Summers
Wallace MacDonald - Tom Rushworth
Marguerite Snow - Dodo
Syn De Conde - Jose
Lloyd Whitlock - Carter Willis
Dorothy Abril - Kittens Dalmayne
Harry Dunkinson - Max Morko
Helene Sullivan - Jane Hamilton

References

External links

series of lobby cards(archived)
Mary MacLaren, lobby card from the film
still lobby card

1920 films
Lost American films
American silent feature films
Universal Pictures films
American black-and-white films
Films directed by Harry L. Franklin
Films based on short fiction
Silent American drama films
1920 drama films
1920s American films
1920 lost films
Lost drama films
English-language drama films